Germinal epithelium can refer to:
 Germinal epithelium (female), a layer of cells covering the ovary
 Germinal epithelium (male), a layer of cells covering the testicle
 Germ layer, primary tissue layer formed during embryogenesis in animals

See also 
 Germinal (disambiguation)
 Epithelium